Leon Leonard (March 11, 1909 – February 1, 1995) was an American politician who served in the New Jersey General Assembly from the Atlantic district from 1941 to 1948. He served as Speaker of the New Jersey General Assembly in 1947.

References

1909 births
1995 deaths
Speakers of the New Jersey General Assembly
Republican Party members of the New Jersey General Assembly
20th-century American politicians